Susana Escobar (born 13 December 1987 in Guanajuato, Guanajuato) is a Mexican swimmer and Olympian. As of October 2008, she attends and swims for the USA's University of Texas at Austin.

At the 2008 Olympics, she set 3 Mexican Records in the 3 events she swam: the 400 free (4:11.99 – 20th), 800 free (8:33.51 – 18th), and 400 IM (4:47.32 – 30th).

She also swam at the 2007 Pan American Games. She also competed at the 2009 World Championships in Rome.  She also competed at the 2012 Summer Olympics, in the 400 m freestyle and the 400 m individual medley.

See also
List of Mexican records in swimming

References

External links
 
 
 

1987 births
Living people
Sportspeople from Guanajuato
People from Guanajuato City
Mexican female freestyle swimmers
Female medley swimmers
Olympic swimmers of Mexico
Competitors at the 2005 Summer Universiade
Swimmers at the 2007 Pan American Games
Swimmers at the 2008 Summer Olympics
Swimmers at the 2011 Pan American Games
Swimmers at the 2012 Summer Olympics
Texas Longhorns women's swimmers
Pan American Games bronze medalists for Mexico
Pan American Games medalists in swimming
Competitors at the 2006 Central American and Caribbean Games
Competitors at the 2010 Central American and Caribbean Games
Central American and Caribbean Games gold medalists for Mexico
Central American and Caribbean Games silver medalists for Mexico
Central American and Caribbean Games medalists in swimming
Medalists at the 2011 Pan American Games
Mexican sports coaches
Swimming coaches
20th-century Mexican women
21st-century Mexican women